Tephritis candidipennis is a species of tephritid or fruit flies in the genus Tephritis of the family Tephritidae found in the United States.

Distribution
Canada, United States.

References

Tephritinae
Insects described in 1960
Diptera of North America